Hrabia Eryk Kurnatowski (8 October 1883 – 23 February 1975) was a Polish nobleman and politician who served a Member of the Senate from 1922 to 1927. Brought up in an old Calvinist noble family, he converted to Catholicism later in life.

References 

Clan of Łodzia
Polish nobility
Polish politicians
 Polish Calvinist and Reformed Christians 
Polish Roman Catholics
1883 births
1975 deaths